Conepatus robustus, the Florida hog-nosed skunk, is an extinct species of skunk known from the Sangamonian of Florida.

The Florida hog-nosed skunk was larger than any living species of hog-nosed skunk, and would have been the largest living skunk at the time it existed.

References

Pleistocene carnivorans
Skunks
Pleistocene mammals of North America
Pleistocene extinctions